Gordon is a city in Wilkinson County, Georgia, United States. As of the 2010 census, the town's population was 2,017.

History
Gordon was founded as a depot on the Central of Georgia Railway.

The city was named after William Washington Gordon, a railroad official.

Geography

Demographics

2020 census

As of the 2020 United States census, there were 1,783 people across 714 households and 410 families residing in the city.

2000 census
As of the census of 2000, there were 2,152 people, 826 households, and 579 families residing in the city. The racial makeup of the city was 47.72% White, 51.58% African American, 0.14% Native American, 0.09% Asian, 0.09% from other races, and 0.37% from two or more races. Hispanic or Latino of any race were 0.19% of the population.

There were 826 households, out of which 32.1% had children under the age of 18 living with them, 45.0% were married couples living together, 21.3% had a female householder with no husband present, and 29.9% were non-families. 27.2% of all households were made up of individuals, and 11.4% had someone living alone who was 65 years of age or older.  The average household size was 2.61 and the average family size was 3.16.

In the city, the population was spread out, with 27.6% under the age of 18, 9.1% from 18 to 24, 27.0% from 25 to 44, 22.6% from 45 to 64, and 13.7% who were 65 years of age or older.  The median age was 35 years. For every 100 females, there were 87.1 males.  For every 100 females age 18 and over, there were 81.7 males.

The median income for a household in the city was $32,891, and the median income for a family was $39,189. Males had a median income of $33,661 versus $20,968 for females. The per capita income for the city was $13,771.  About 19.3% of families and 21.4% of the population were below the poverty line, including 30.4% of those under age 18 and 15.9% of those age 65 or over.

Notable people
Jim Williams, preservationist

References

Cities in Georgia (U.S. state)
Cities in Wilkinson County, Georgia